The Groovie Ghoulies were an American pop punk band from Sacramento, California, United States, whose music took inspiration from horror movies. They released numerous albums, EPs, and singles, and toured internationally.  The band's name was taken from the 1970s animated television series Groovie Goolies, a spinoff of Sabrina, the Teenage Witch.

History
Though the group's lineup fluctuated significantly throughout their career, bassist/vocalist Jeff Alexander (under the punk name "Kepi Ghoulie") remained a constant fixture. Guitarist Rochelle "Roach" Sparman (lead singer Kepi's wife) was also a longtime member. The Groovie Ghoulies' music is best classified as pop-punk and is heavily influenced by early punk groups such as the Ramones, the Misfits, and The Dickies, 1960s garage rock and bubblegum artists such as The Troggs and The Monkees, and 1950s rock and roll artists such as Chuck Berry and Jerry Lee Lewis. Throughout their career the Groovie Ghoulies recorded cover versions of songs by several of these artists as well as other influences including KISS, Daniel Johnston and Neil Diamond.

The Groovie Ghoulies announced their breakup on May 9, 2007, just days prior to the release of their ninth studio album 99 Lives. The main reason for the breakup was the difficulty of having kept the band together after Kepi and Roach had divorced.

In 2008, two tribute albums were released. Let's Go Ghoulie from US-based Knowhere Records and When The Kids Go Go Go Crazy on German label Kamikaze Records each featured artists from Europe and North America.

Lead singer Jeff (Kepi) Alexander has recorded cover versions of Groovie Ghoulies songs on various releases since the band's breakup. Fun In The Dark with The Accelerators was released in 2015; Re-Animation Festival, with  The Copyrights, was released in 2019.

In September of 2022, Kepi announced that the entire Groovie Ghoulies back catalogue would be released via Pirates Press.

Former band members
 Jeff (Kepi) Alexander – bass, lead vocals (original and final line up)
 Rochelle (Roach) Sparman – guitar, backing vocals (final line up)
 Nora (Scampi) Fasano – drums, backing vocals (final line up)
 John (Rudge) Rudgers – guitar (original line up)
 Geolyn Carvin – guitar, backing vocals (original line up)
 John (Vetty) Vetter – bass (original line up)
 John Phillip (Johny) Sosa – drums (original line up)
 John Harris – drums
 Dan (Panic) Sullivan – drums
 Wendy Powell – drums, backing vocals
 B-Face Rat – bass
 Matt K. Shrugg – drums
 Jaz Brown – drums
 Dan Reynoso (Danny Secretion) – drums
 Jason Patrone – bass (quit after 2 weeks)
 Skid Jones – guitar
 Amy – Drums
 Brian – Drums
 Dave – Drums
 Andrew Phillips – guitar

Discography

Albums

EPs

Singles

Splits

Compilation albums
 Tantrum – 1990 LP/CD
  Gabba Gabba Hey – 1991 CD
 Groin Thunder – 1992 CD
 Heide Sez – 1996 CD
 Team Mint – 1996 CD
 Back Asswards – 1996 CD
 More Bounce to the Ounce – 1997 CD
 The Last Great Thing You Did – 1997 CD
 Psycho Sisters – 1998 CD
 Forward Til Death – 1999 CD
 Built For Speed – 1999 CD
 Short Music For Short People – 1999 CD
 Runnin' On Fumes – 2000 CD
 Lookout! Freakout – 2000 CD
 3 Chord Rocket Science – 2001 CD
 A Tribute to NOFX  – 2002 CD
 A Punk Tribute to AC/DC – 2002 CD
 Third Strike Punk Rock Strike Volume Three – 2002 CD
 A Fistful of Rock N Roll Vol. No. 10 – 2002 CD
 Pop Punk Loves You – 2002 CD
 The Rocky Horror Punk Rock Show – 2003 CD
 Punk Rock High School Int. – 2004 CD
 MolokoPlus No. 26 – 2004 CD
 Volume 4: Pop Punk – 2005 CD
 Backyard City Rockers 3 – 2005 CD

References

Horror punk groups
Musical groups from Sacramento, California
Pop punk groups from California
Musical groups established in 1983
1983 establishments in California
Musical groups disestablished in 2007
2007 disestablishments in California